The New Brunswick Tankard is the New Brunswick provincial championship for men's curling. It was formerly called the Papa John's Pizza Tankard, Pepsi Tankard, Molson Canadian Men's Provincial Curling Championship, Alexander Keith's Tankard, the Labatt Tankard and Ganong Cup. The tournament is run by the New Brunswick Curling Association. The winner represents Team New Brunswick at the Tim Hortons Brier.

Qualification
The eight teams that play in the provincial are selected from either the preliminary round or the wild card round.

Winners

References
New Brunswick Men's Champions - John Murphy's Curling Page

The Brier provincial tournaments
Curling competitions in New Brunswick
1920s establishments in New Brunswick